Lai Feng-wei (born 20 September 1953) is a Taiwanese politician. He is the Magistrate of Penghu County since 25 December 2018 after winning the 2018 municipality election of the Republic of China on 24 November 2018.

Political careers

2018 Penghu County magistrate election

2019 Mainland China visit
On 12 August 2019, Lai, along with Lienchiang County Magistrate Liu Cheng-ying and Kinmen County Magistrate Yang Cheng-wu, visited Beijing and met with Taiwan Affairs Office Director Liu Jieyi requesting Mainland China government to lift up individual travel ban of Mainland Chinese tourists to the three counties due to the constraint cross-strait relations. The mainland government eventually agreed to lift up the ban on 20 September 2019.

References

External links

 

1953 births
Living people
Magistrates of Penghu County